This page lists the World Best Year Performance in the year 2000 in both the men's and the women's hammer throw. The main event during this season were the Olympic Games in Sydney, Australia, where the final of the men's competition was held on Sunday September 24, 2000. The women had their first ever Olympic final five days later, on Friday September 29, 2000 in the Olympic Stadium.

Men

Records

2000 World Year Ranking

Women

Records

2000 World Year Ranking

References
tilastopaja 
apulanta
digilander.libero
IAAF
hammerthrow.wz

2000
Hammer Throw Year Ranking, 2000